The 2007 NAIA Division II Men’s Basketball national championship was held in March at Keeter Gymnasium in Point Lookout, Missouri.  The 16th annual NAIA basketball tournament featured 32 teams playing in a single-elimination format.

Awards and honors

Leading scorer: 110 - Monty Rogers (Mayville State)
Leading rebounder: 52 - Chad Schuiteman (Northwestern Iowa)
Tournament MVP: Adam Hepker (MidAmerica Nazarene)
Coach of the Year: Craig Smith (Mayville State)

Bracket

  * denotes overtime.

See also
2007 NAIA Division I men's basketball tournament
2007 NCAA Division I men's basketball tournament
2007 NCAA Division II men's basketball tournament
2007 NCAA Division III men's basketball tournament
2007 NAIA Division II women's basketball tournament

References

NAIA Men's Basketball Championship
Tournament
2007 in sports in Missouri